Devil's Film is an American pornographic film studio, based in Chatsworth, Los Angeles, California. Launched in 1997, the studio continues to specialize in swinger and gang bang oriented gonzo pornography and niche product centered on such popular fetishes as interracial pornography, transsexual pornography, and MILF pornography.

History 
Devil's Film entered the adult parody market in 2009 with the release of Coctomom, a spoof inspired by tabloid sensation Nadya Suleman ("Octomom") after giving birth to octuplets through in vitro fertilisation. Parodies of HBO's Big Love, AMC's Mad Men, ABC's The Bachelor and NBC's The Biggest Loser soon followed, along with send-ups of Fast Times at Ridgemont High and the entire Twilight Saga.

Management
In April 2013, Giant Media Group, the parent company of Pipedream Products, announced the acquisition of Devil's Film.

Operations 
Devil's Film is also home to lesbian shingle The L Factor and transsexual studio GoodFellas Productions, producer of America's Next Top Tranny, a parody of The CW's long-running reality series America's Next Top Model.

Awards

References

External links
 
 

1997 establishments in California
American pornographic film studios
Gonzo pornography
Film production companies of the United States
Companies based in Los Angeles
Pornography in Los Angeles
Mass media companies established in 1997